Honiton Community College is a comprehensive academy school located in Honiton, Devon, England. It was originally established as Honiton Secondary School in 1938, and converted to an academy in 2011. The school educates around 735 students, of whom 95 are in age 16-19 study programmes, and employs 124 staff. The current principal is Alex Kirkbride, who follows Glenn Smith, who in turn, took up the post in September 2009 following the retirement of predecessor Norman Tyson.

The school held 'specialist' status in science from 2005 until the specialist schools programme ended in 2010.

Reputation and external recognition 
As of the latest inspection on 17 March 2016, the school is considered to have an overall effectiveness of 'good' by Ofsted.

Campus and buildings 

Parts of the College's physical estate date back to its founding in the late 1930s, and the school has faced a legacy of poor construction for much of its history. In 1993, former Principal Norman Tyson described it as 'hut city', and the college was then believed to have had the highest number of temporary classrooms in Devon.

Recent capital investment of ~£5 million between 2011 and 2018 has significantly improved the school's infrastructure and facilities, with the introduction of a number of purpose-built facilities, including an AV suite, dance studio, gym, sports hall, and sixth form common area as well as a total refurbishment of English and the old Science block.

Student activities 
In September 2010, the school launched a student-led local radio station as 'Radio HCC' on 87.7FM. Students at the school also maintain a YouTube channel.

Principals 
 Alex Kirkbride (2022–Present)
 Glenn Smith (2009-2022)
 Norman Tyson (1993-2009)
 Derek Yates ( - 1993)

Notable former students 
 Douglas Fordyce — acrobatic gymnast
 Nathan Hannay - rugby union player
 Aaron Jarvis — international rugby union player
 David Lye — English cricketer
 Maurice Setters — English football player and manager
 Charlie Wright — rugby union player

References

External links
 Official site
 Governance documents, including financial reports and strategic plans

Secondary schools in Devon
Academies in Devon
Honiton
Educational institutions established in 1938
1938 establishments in England